Army Group North was a German strategic formation, commanding a grouping of field armies during World War II. The German Army Group was subordinated to the Oberkommando des Heeres (OKH), the German army high command, and coordinated the operations of attached separate army corps, reserve formations, rear services and logistics, including the Army Group North Rear Area.

A formation named Army Group North was deployed on two separate occasions: Once during the Invasion of Poland (September – October 1939) and once during the German-Soviet war (1941–1945). The latter formation was trapped in the Courland peninsula in modern-day Latvia and was redesignated Army Group Courland on 25 January 1945.

First deployment of Army Group North: September – October 1939 

The staff of Army Group North was formally assembled on 2 September 1939 from the headquarters of 2nd Army, which in turn had been activated just a few days prior, on 26 August. Fedor von Bock, commanding general of 2nd Army, became the first commanding general of Army Group North.

During the Invasion of Poland, Army Group North had two armies placed under its supervision: 3rd Army (Georg von Küchler) and 4th Army (Günther von Kluge). Additionally, it held four divisions as part of its army group reserves: 10th Panzer Division, 73rd Infantry Division, 206th Infantry Division and 208th Infantry Division.

On the morning of 1 September 1939, 3rd Army began its advance from East Prussia southwards towards central Poland, whereas 4th Army attacked from Pomerania into the Danzig Corridor.

Important battles by the 3rd Army during the Polish campaign included the Battle of Grudziądz, the Battle of Mława, the Battle of Różan, the Battle of Łomża, the Battle of Wizna and the Battle of Brześć Litewski. Important battles of the 4th Army included the Battle of Tuchola Forest, the Battle of Westerplatte, the Battle of Hel and the Battle of Gdynia.

Second deployment of Army Group North: June 1941 – January 1945

Invasion of the Soviet Union 

In preparation for Operation Barbarossa, Army Group North was reformed from Army Group C on 22 June 1941. Army Group North was commanded by Field Marshal Wilhelm Ritter von Leeb  and staged in East Prussia. Its strategic goal was Leningrad, with operational objectives being the territories of the Baltic republics and securing the northern flank of Army Group Centre in Northern Russia between Western Dvina River and Daugavpils-Kholm Army Group boundary. On commencement of the Wehrmacht's Baltic offensive operation the army group deployed into Lithuania and northern Belorussia. It served mainly in Baltic territories and north Russia until 1944. Commander in Chief 22 June 1941: Wilhelm Ritter von Leeb.

Its subordinate armies were deployed with the following immediate objectives:
 18th Army - from Koenigsberg to Ventspils - Jelgava
 4th Panzer Group - Pskov
 16th Army - Kaunas, Daugavpils
Army Group troops
 Army-Group signals regiment 537
 Army-Group signals regiment 639 (2nd echelon)

The Baltic offensive operation 
All operational objectives such as Tallinn were achieved despite stubborn Red Army resistance and several unsuccessful counter-offensives such as the Battle of Raseiniai, and the army group approached Leningrad, commencing the Siege of Leningrad. However, while the Baltic states were overrun, the Siege of Leningrad continued until 1944, when it was lifted as a result of the Red Army Leningrad-Novgorod strategic offensive operation.

In September 1941, the Spanish Blue Division was assigned to Army Group North.

Northern Russia offensive operation 
Composition:
October 1941
 16th Army
 18th Army

Nevsky Pyatachok
Operation Nordlicht

Northern Russia defensive campaign 
Commander in Chief 17 January 1942: GFM Georg von Küchler

Composition:
September 1942
 11th Army
 16th Army
 18th Army

December 1942
 16th Army
 18th Army

Demyansk Pocket
Kholm Pocket
Soviet Toropets-Kholm Operation
Battle of Velikiye Luki
Battle of Krasny Bor

Baltic defensive campaign 
Commander in Chief 9 January 1944: Field marshal Walter Model
Commander in Chief 31 March 1944: Generaloberst Georg Lindemann
Commander in Chief 4 July 1944: Generaloberst Johannes Frießner
Commander in Chief 23 July 1944: GFM Ferdinand Schörner

March 1944
 Army detachment "Narwa"
 16th Army
 18th Army
Battle of Narva, consisting of:
Battle for Narva Bridgehead and
Battle of Tannenberg Line
Combat in South Estonia, 1944
Soviet Baltic Offensive
Battle of Porkuni
Battle of Vilnius (1944)
Battle of Memel

After becoming trapped in the Courland Cauldron after 25 January 1945, the Army Group was renamed Army Group Courland. On the same day, in East Prussia, a new Army Group North was created by renaming Army Group Center. On the 2 April 1945, the army group was dissolved, and the staff formed the 12th Army headquarters.

Campaign in East Prussia 
Army Group North (old Army Group Centre), was driven into an ever smaller pocket around Königsberg in East Prussia. On April 9, 1945 Königsberg finally fell to the Red Army, although remnants of Army Group units continued to resist on the Heiligenbeil & Danzig beachheads until the end of the war in Europe.

October 1944
 16th Army
 Armee-Abteilung Grasser
 18th Army

November 1944
 16th Army
 Armee-Abteilung Kleffel
 18 Armee

December 1944
 16th Army
 18th Army

Soviet East Prussian Offensive
Battle of Königsberg
Heiligenbeil pocket

Campaign in West Prussia 
Commander in Chief 27 January 1945: Generaloberst Dr. Lothar Rendulic
Commander in Chief 12 March 1945: Walter Weiß
Composition:
February 1945
 Armee-Abteilung Samland
 4th Army

Soviet East Pomeranian Offensive
Battle of Kolberg
Courland Pocket
On the 25 January 1945 Hitler renamed three army groups. Army Group North became Army Group Courland, more appropriate as it had been isolated from Army Group Centre and was trapped in Courland, Latvia; Army Group Centre became Army Group North and Army Group A became Army Group Centre.

Commanders

See also 
 Army Group South
 Army Group Centre
 German order of battle for Operation Fall Weiss
Police Regiment North

Notes and references

Bibliography 
 

North
Military units and formations established in 1939
Military units and formations disestablished in 1945